Rangoon (2017 film) may refer to:

 Rangoon (2017 Tamil film), an Indian Tamil-language film
 Rangoon (2017 Hindi film), an Indian Hindi-language film